Park Hye-min (born 1990), known professionally as Pony or Pony Park, is a South Korean make-up artist, blogger, and Beauty YouTuber. Pony is credited with popularizing Korean beauty trends worldwide. She was listed in Forbes 30 Under 30 Asia in 2017 for her make-up career.

Throughout her career, Pony has authored several how-to books on applying make-up and collaborated with multiple make-up brands. In addition, she is the founder of her own make-up brand, Pony Effect.

Career

The name "Pony" came from her nickname at school, which she has used as her online name since. Having enjoyed drawing since childhood, Pony kept a blog on Cyworld and also began practicing make-up looks while she was a third-year high school student. She began posting video tutorials at the request of other users, which were positively received. Pony went to university to become a graphic designer and later worked at an office. In 2010, she was approached by a publisher to write a series of books on make-up tips, which were later released in 2011, 2012, and 2014 in Taiwan, Thailand, Indonesia, China, and Japan. She eventually quit her job to pursue make-up full-time. For a while, she also worked as a make-up artist for singer CL.

After launching her YouTube channel, Pony Syndrome, in 2015, Pony gained over 4,400,000 subscribers in 2018. This has been helped by her providing English subtitles to her videos and focusing on a diverse range of make-up looks for a global audience. In addition to posting make-up looks, Pony also created tutorials for celebrity transformations.

In 2015, Pony launched her make-up brand, Pony Effect, through the Korean beauty retailer Memebox.

Personal life

Pony married her boyfriend in May 2017, whom she had been dating for 10 years. In addition to speaking her native language, Korean, Pony is also fluent in English.

Endorsements

Pony has been a brand ambassador for Etude House since 2014. In 2018, Pony became a brand ambassador for Bobbi Brown, including releasing a promotional song titled "Outta My Mind." In 2019, Pony released collaboration make-up collections with MAC Cosmetics, ColourPop Cosmetics, Revolve, Etude House, and NYX Professional Makeup. For her collaboration with MAC Cosmetics, Pony released a digital single, "Divine", to promote its release. In 2020, she became the first Korean collaborator of the brand Morphe.

Discography

Publications

Korean

Japanese

References

1990 births
Living people
Video bloggers
Women video bloggers
Beauty and makeup YouTubers
South Korean women artists
South Korean bloggers
South Korean women bloggers
YouTube vloggers
South Korean YouTubers
Make-up artists